Blåskimen Island is a high, ice-covered island about  north of Novyy Island, at the juncture of the Jelbart Ice Shelf and the Fimbul Ice Shelf, Queen Maud Land. The feature was roughly delineated by Norwegian cartographers working with air photos taken by the Norwegian–British–Swedish Antarctic Expedition in 1951–52 and the Sixth Norwegian Antarctic Expedition in 1958–59. They called the island Blåskimen and included the area now called Novyy Island. The Soviet Antarctic Expedition mapped the feature in 1961 and showed it to be separated from Novyy Island.

See also 
 List of antarctic and sub-antarctic islands

References 

Islands of Queen Maud Land
Princess Martha Coast